The Division I Group A tournament was held at DNB Arena in Stavanger, Norway, from 7 to 13 April 2013. The Division I Group B was contested from 8 to 14 April 2013 at Patinoire Iceberg in Strasbourg, France. The winners of the Division I Group A were initially presumed to be promoted to the 2015 Top Division. However, with the Divisions I and II playing in an Olympic year, and the eight Olympic entries being in none of those tournaments, it was determined that the last placed Olympic team will play a challenge series with the 2014 Division I Group A champion for promotion to the 2015 Top Division. The last-placed team of the Division I Group A was relegated to the Division I Group B for 2014. The Group B winners moved up to Group A, while the last placed team was relegated to the Division II Group A.

Division I Group A

All times local (UTC+2).

Statistics and awards

Scoring leaders 
GP = Games played; G = Goals; A = Assists; Pts = Points; +/− = Plus-minus; PIM = Penalties In MinutesSource: IIHF.com

Goaltending leaders 
(minimum 40% team's total ice time)

TOI = Time on ice (minutes:seconds); GA = Goals against; GAA = Goals against average; Sv% = Save percentage; SO = ShutoutsSource: IIHF.com

Directorate Awards
Goaltender: Kamilla Lund Nielsen, 
Defenseman: Ayaka Toko, 
Forward: Line Bialik Øien, 

Source: IIHF.com

Division I Group B

All times local (UTC+2).

Statistics and awards

Scoring leaders 
GP = Games played; G = Goals; A = Assists; Pts = Points; +/− = Plus-minus; PIM = Penalties In MinutesSource: IIHF.com

Goaltending leaders 
(minimum 40% team's total ice time)

TOI = Time on ice (minutes:seconds); GA = Goals against; GAA = Goals against average; Sv% = Save percentage; SO = ShutoutsSource: IIHF.com

Directorate Awards
Goaltender: Claudia van Leeuwen, 
Defenseman: Athena Locatelli, 
Forward: Marion Allemoz, 
Source: IIHF.com

References

External links
Official website of IIHF
Complete results at Passionhockey.com

I
2012
2012
World
World
IIHF Women's World Championship Division I